Santi Aquila e Priscilla is a Roman Catholic church dedicated to saints Aquila and Priscilla in the quartiere Portuense (Q.XI) of Rome, on via Pietro Blaserna. The church was consecrated on November 15, 1992.

In 1994, John Paul II designated it as a cardinal's titular church. The title has been held by Cardinal Juan García Rodríguez, Archbishop of Havana, since 5 October 2019.

History

The Church was designed by architect Ignazio Breccia Fratadocchi and inaugurated by Cardinal Vicar Ugo Poletti on May 10, 1992. Pope John Paul II consecrated the church on November 15, 1992.

The parish was established on November 5, 1971 by a decree of Cardinal Vicar Angelo Dell'Acqua entitled Neminem fugit.

Description
The church is elliptical. The chancel is dominated by a large neo-Byzantine mural and a massive pipe organ. At the side is the chapel of the Blessed Sacrament illuminated by stained glass. A nursery is located at the bottom of the church, near the main entrance.

Cardinal-priests
Jaime Lucas Ortega y Alamino (1994–2019)
Juan de la Caridad García Rodríguez (2019–present)

References

External links
 The board of the parish from the site of the Diocese of Rome
 Aerial photograph of the church

Aquila e Priscilla
Roman Catholic churches completed in 1992
20th-century Roman Catholic church buildings in Italy
Rome Q. XI Portuense